Arthur Penrose Seymour (20 March 1832 – 3 April 1923) was a 19th-century New Zealand politician from Picton. He was the 4th Superintendent of the Marlborough Province and was a member of the provincial government for all 16 years of its existence. With his strong advocacy for Picton, he successfully had the Seat of Government moved to Picton. When the Blenheim party secured a majority in the Provincial Council by 1865, Seymour negotiated the removal of the Seat of Government back to Blenheim.

Seymour was a member of parliament for various Marlborough electorates for a total of twelve years. Prior to his election to Parliament, he had been appointed to the Legislative Council. He was three times Mayor of Picton.

Early life
Seymour was born in 1832 in Marksbury, Somersetshire, England, the fourth son of the Reverend George Turner Seymour & his wife Marianne née Billingsley. He emigrated to New Zealand in 1851 on the Maori, travelling with his sister Marie Louise and her husband, Dr Ralph Richardson. Henry Seymour, who returned from England on the same ship, was unrelated. Arthur Seymour settled in Picton, Marlborough shortly after his arrival. He was a surveyor by profession, but became a runholder in the Awatere Valley. He was appointed a Justice of the peace in 1856. On 23 October 1856, he married Catherine Florence Huddleston at Nelson, the daughter of the Nelson businessman Frederick Huddleston.

Politics

Marlborough Province
Seymour was elected onto the first Marlborough Provincial Council in 1860. During the council's first meeting, Seymour successfully moved that the provincial offices be built in Picton. This further fuelled the ongoing political conflict with other politicians who favoured Blenheim as the seat of provincial government. The Seat of Government shifted from Blenheim to Picton in 1861, only to revert to Blenheim in 1866. Together with all the other intense personal rivalries in the (e.g. between small farmers and pastoralists), provincial politics had a comic opera quality to it in the Marlborough Province. Seymour fuelled this conflict by being a stern supporter of Picton.

He served on the council over all of its 16 years of existence. He represented the electorates of Picton in the 1st, 2nd, 3rd, 5th and 6th council, and Awatere in the 4th and 7th council.

He was the Superintendent of Marlborough Province twice. His first time in office was from 19 September 1864 until Oct 1865. He resigned as he had been appointed to the Legislative Council in 1865. His second period as Superintendent was from 19 February 1874 until the abolition of provincial government on 31 October 1876.

Seymour was twice on the executive of the provincial council. First in 1860, and then in June and July 1864.

Legislative Council
Seymour was a member of the Legislative Council since 8 July 1865. During this time on the council, the dispute over the Seat of Government of Marlborough Province worsened and Seymour eventually resigned from the Legislative Council on 5 January 1872 to stand for Parliament to further his vision for Marlborough.

Parliament

He represented the Marlborough electorate of Wairau from 1872 to 6 May 1875 when he resigned, and from 1876 to 1881, when he was defeated.

The 1876 election was contested against George Henderson, a former Mayor of Blenheim. The 1881 general election was contested by Seymour and Henry Dodson, with Dodson gaining the majority support during the show of hands at the nomination meeting. On election day, Dodson and Seymour received 550 and 381 votes, respectively, a significant majority of 169. Dodson was thus returned.

The 1887 general election in the Waimea-Picton electorate was contested by Seymour, Joseph Harkness and Charles H. Mills, who received 446, 444 and 415 votes, respectively. Seymour was thus elected. He represented the electorate until the end of the term in 1890.

Seymour was the 4th Chairman of Committees, replacing the acting chairman Maurice O'Rorke on 16 July 1873. He held this post until May 1875, when he resigned. He was again elected into this position in July 1879 and held the role until dissolution of parliament in November 1881.

Local body politics and Personal career
Seymour was three times mayor of Picton. He was a member of the Marlborough Land Board for many years. He was the longest serving Chairman of the Education Board in New Zealand's history as he was the longest serving member of the Waste Lands Board. Seymour was a captain in the militia, a Runholder (Tyntesfield), Captain and President of the Picton Cricket Club, President of the Marlborough Club, President of the Marlborough Lawn Tennis Club, President of the Blenheim and Picton Literary Institutes. He was also Chairman of the Picton Hospital, a Vestryman, Churchwarden and Layreader for the Holy Trinity Church at Picton, a Surveyor & Architect by Trade, and was an advocate for Industry in Marlborough; such as Goldmining, Coal mining, Frozen Meat Trade to England, Flaxmilling etc...

Death
Seymour died at Picton on Tuesday, 3 April 1923. He was buried at Picton Cemetery.

Notes

References

1832 births
1923 deaths
Members of the New Zealand House of Representatives
Members of the New Zealand Legislative Council
Superintendents of New Zealand provincial councils
New Zealand MPs for South Island electorates
Members of the Marlborough Provincial Council
Mayors of Picton, New Zealand
Unsuccessful candidates in the 1881 New Zealand general election
Unsuccessful candidates in the 1890 New Zealand general election
People from Bath and North East Somerset
English emigrants to New Zealand
19th-century New Zealand politicians